Bazlur Mohamed Rahman (born 17 October 1959) is a Bangladeshi swimmer. He competed in the men's 100 metre breaststroke at the 1988 Summer Olympics.

References

External links
 

1959 births
Living people
Bangladeshi male swimmers
Olympic swimmers of Bangladesh
Swimmers at the 1988 Summer Olympics
Place of birth missing (living people)